Viscount  was a general in the early Imperial Japanese Army during the First Sino-Japanese War and the Russo-Japanese War. His great-great-grandson, Shinzō Abe was Prime Minister of Japan.

Biography
Ōshima was born as the eldest son to a samurai of Chōshū Domain (present-day Yamaguchi Prefecture), and fought as a member of the Satchō Alliance forces in support of Emperor Meiji during the Boshin War against the Tokugawa shogunate. After the Meiji Restoration, he attended military school in Osaka in 1870 and was commissioned as a lieutenant in the fledgling Imperial Japanese Army in August 1871. Assigned to the IJA 4th Infantry Regiment, he was promoted to captain the following year, and became battalion commander of the IJA 1st Infantry Regiment in 1873. During the Satsuma Rebellion of 1877, he was promoted to major. After the war, he served in a number of staff positions with the Sendai Garrison and became a colonel in 1886. In 1887 he became chief-of-staff of the Tokyo Garrison and following the reorganization of the Imperial Japanese Army under the recommendations of Prussian military advisor Jakob Meckel, he became chief-of-staff of the IJA 1st Division. In June 1891, Ōshima was promoted to major general and was assigned command of the IJA 9th Infantry Brigade, which was also styled the “Ōshima Combined Brigade”. Dispatched to the Korean Peninsula in 1894 during the Donghak Rebellion, his 4,000 man force was tasked with expelling the Empire of China's Beiyang Army from Korean territory by force.

On July 28, 1894, his forces defeated the Chinese at the Battle of Seonghwan outside of Asan, south of Seoul in the first land engagement of the First Sino-Japanese War. For his victory, Ōshima was made a baron (danshaku) in the kazoku peerage system, and assigned to command of the Tsushima Garrison. In February 1898 he was promoted to lieutenant general.

During the Russo-Japanese War, Ōshima was commander of the IJA 3rd Division under the Japanese Second Army, under General Oku Yasukata. He led the division at the Battle of Liaoyang, Battle of Shaho, and the Battle of Mukden.   At the end of the war, he was promoted to general, and served as Governor-General of Kwantung Leased Territory from October 1905 to April 1912. During this time, he laid the foundations of what would be called the Kwantung Army.

In 1907, Ōshima was elevated in status to viscount (shishaku). He served on the Imperial Japanese Army General Staff from September 1911, and was awarded the Order of the Paulownia Flowers in June 1912. He retired from service in August 1915, and died in 1926.

Decorations
 1878 –  Order of the Rising Sun, 4th class
 1885 –  Order of the Rising Sun, 3rd class 
 1895 -  Order of the Sacred Treasure, 2nd class 
 1895 –  Order of the Rising Sun, 2nd class 
 1901 –  Order of the Golden Kite, 3rd class 
 1903 –  Grand Cordon of the Order of the Sacred Treasure 
 1906 –  Grand Cordon of the Order of the Rising Sun
 1906 –  Order of the Golden Kite, 2nd class
 1912 –  Order of the Rising Sun: Grand Cordon of the Paulownia Flowers

References

Footnotes

Japanese generals
Japanese colonial governors and administrators
1850 births
1926 deaths
Kazoku
Samurai
Mōri retainers
Japanese military personnel of the Russo-Japanese War
People of the Boshin War
Japanese military personnel of the First Sino-Japanese War
People of the Kwantung Leased Territory
Military personnel from Yamaguchi Prefecture
People from Chōshū domain
People of Meiji-period Japan
Grand Cordons of the Order of the Rising Sun
Recipients of the Order of the Golden Kite, 2nd class
Recipients of the Order of the Sacred Treasure, 1st class
Recipients of the Order of the Rising Sun with Paulownia Flowers
Recipients of the Order of the Plum Blossom